The Himalayan woodpecker (Dendrocopos himalayensis) is a species of bird in the family Picidae. It is found in the northern regions of the Indian subcontinent, primarily the Himalayas and some adjoining areas, and ranges across Afghanistan, India, Nepal, Bhutan and Pakistan. Its natural habitats are boreal forests and temperate forests. The International Union for Conservation of Nature has assessed its conservation status as being of "least concern".

Description
Glossy black above with broad white patches from shoulder to lower back, limited white barring on flight feathers and clean white tail edgings. Underparts and head white or plain pale buff with black Y-shaped mark on neck and cheeks. The crown is red in males and black in females. Black marks under eyes are unique and distinguish it from other species. Vent and under-tail coverts red or pink. Iris chestnut, beak blackish and legs grey. The juvenile is duller, greyish-black above, and with vent and under-tail areas less vivid and crown greyish with some red (in both sexes).

Ecology
Its habitat is either wet or dry upland forest with either deciduous or coniferous trees, and often with rhododendrons. It forages individually, usually on trunks and large branches but sometimes on the ground. Its diet is varied, with insects, fruits, seeds and sap. It sometimes hammers fir cones on stones to extract the seeds.

Status
The Himalayan woodpecker has a wide range and is generally a common or fairly common bird. No particular threats have been recognized and the population trend is thought to be steady. The International Union for Conservation of Nature has assessed its conservation status as being of "least concern".

Gallery

References

Himalayan woodpecker
Birds of Afghanistan
Birds of the Himalayas
Birds of Nepal
Birds of Pakistan
Himalayan woodpecker
Taxonomy articles created by Polbot